Tim Benton (born 21 June 1945, Rome) is Professor Emeritus in the History of Art at the Open University in the UK as well as a writer and broadcaster. He has also taught at Columbia University, Williams College, and École Polytechnique Fédérale de Lausanne. He has written extensively on the modernist architect Le Corbusier. A large collection of photographs by Tim Benton is held in the Courtauld Institute of Art's Conway Library archive, which is currently undergoing a digitisation project.

Education 
Tim Benton was educated at the University of Cambridge and the Courtauld Institute of Art, London.

Professional memberships 
Benton is a member of the Association for the preservation of "E-1027" designed by Eileen Gray with murals added by Le Corbusier. The site includes Le Corbusier's holiday home ("Cabanon de vacances") and the Etoile de Mer restaurant, in Roquebrune-Cap-Martin, France.

Bibliography
His writings include:

  Benton, Tim. Le Corbusier conférencier, Editions Le Moniteur, 2007. This book won the 2008 Prix National du Livre awarded by the Académie d'Architecture in France. 
  Benton, Tim. The Villas of Le Corbusier and Pierre Jeanneret 1920-1930, Birkhäuser and Editions de La Villette, 2007
  Benton, Tim. The Modernist Home, V&A Publications, 2006
  Benton, Tim. Le Corbusier: La Villa La Roche
  Benton, Tim. Villa Savoye and the Architect's Practice
  Benton, Tim. From the Arengario to the Lictor's Axe: Memories of Italian Fascism
  Benton, Tim. Humanism and Fascism
  Benton, Tim. The little "maison de weekend" and the Parisian suburbs
  Benton, Tim. From Jeanneret to Le Corbusier: Rusting Iron, bricks and coal and the modern Utopia
  Benton, Tim. Pessac and Lège revisited: standards, dimensions and failures
  Benton, Tim. Charlotte Perriand: Les années Le Corbusier
  Benton, Tim. Representing Modernism

Exhibitions and exhibition catalogues
  Benton, Tim. Thirties: British Art and Design Before the War. (co-curator)
  Benton, Tim. Le Corbusier: Architect of the Century. (co-curator)
  Benton, Tim. Le Corbusier.: La Ricerca Paziente. (co-curator)
  Benton, Tim. Le Corbusier et la Mediterrannée. (co-curator)
  Benton, Tim. Art and Power: Europe Under the Dictators 1930–1945. (co-curator)
 Benton, Tim. Art Deco (co-curator and co-editor of the catalogue) and Modernism: Designing a New World.

References

1945 births
Living people
British art historians
Alumni of the Courtauld Institute of Art
Academics of the Open University
Alumni of the University of Cambridge
Architectural photographers
Oikos (journal) editors